Beau Ritchie Taylor (born February 13, 1990) is an American professional baseball catcher who is a free agent. He has played in Major League Baseball (MLB) for the Oakland Athletics, Toronto Blue Jays, and Cleveland Indians.

Career

Amateur
Taylor attended Rockledge High School in Rockledge, Florida and the University of Central Florida (UCF). He played for the UCF Knights baseball team, joining the team as a third baseman but converting to catcher to keep his scholarship. In 2010, he played collegiate summer baseball in the Cape Cod Baseball League for the Yarmouth-Dennis Red Sox.

Oakland Athletics (first stint)
The Oakland Athletics selected Taylor in the fifth round of the 2011 MLB draft. He was suspended for the first 50 games of the 2017 season due to testing positive for Adderall without a prescription. He became a free agent after the 2017 season, and signed a new contract with the Athletics.

Taylor was promoted to the major leagues on September 1, 2018. He elected free agency on November 2, 2018. He re-signed a minor league deal on November 9, 2018. On June 18, 2019, Taylor hit his first major league home run off Gabriel Ynoa in a 16-2 victory over the Baltimore Orioles. On August 14, Taylor was designated for assignment.

Toronto Blue Jays
On August 16, 2019, Taylor was claimed off waivers by the Toronto Blue Jays. Taylor was designated for assignment on September 7.

Oakland Athletics (second stint)
On September 10, 2019, the Oakland Athletics claimed Taylor off waivers. On September 25, Taylor was designated for assignment. He elected free agency on October 8, 2019.

Cleveland Indians
On December 6, 2019, Taylor signed a minor league contract with the Cleveland Indians. The Indians selected Taylor's contract on July 28, 2020. Overall with the 2020 Cleveland Indians, Taylor batted .048 with no home runs and 2 RBIs in 7 games. On March 27, 2021, Taylor was designated for assignment.

Cincinnati Reds
On April 3, 2021, Taylor was claimed off waivers by the Cincinnati Reds.
Taylor spent the 2021 season with the Triple-A Louisville Bats. He played in 75 games for Louisville, hitting .255 with 4 home runs and 23 RBI's. On September 27, 2021, Taylor was designated for assignment by the Reds. On October 13, Taylor elected free agency.

Baltimore Orioles
On March 18, 2022, Taylor signed a minor league contract with the Baltimore Orioles. He was released on July 20, 2022.

Oakland Athletics (third stint)
On July 29, 2022, Taylor signed a minor league deal with the Oakland Athletics. He elected free agency on November 10, 2022.

References

External links

1990 births
Living people
People from Rockledge, Florida
Baseball players from Florida
Major League Baseball catchers
Oakland Athletics players
Toronto Blue Jays players
Cleveland Indians players
UCF Knights baseball players
Yarmouth–Dennis Red Sox players
Vermont Lake Monsters players
Burlington Bees players
Stockton Ports players
Midland RockHounds players
Gigantes del Cibao players
American expatriate baseball players in the Dominican Republic
Nashville Sounds players
Las Vegas Aviators players
Buffalo Bisons (minor league) players
Norfolk Tides players